Ulf Tommy Jönsson (born 4 March 1976) is a Swedish former footballer who played as defender. He represented Malmö FF and Halmstads BK during a career that spanned between 1992 and 2010. A full international in 2003, he won three caps for the Sweden national team.

Club career
Jönsson started his career in the club GIF Nike and at the age of 16 he moved to Malmö FF, where he played for 6 years, until in 1998 when he decided to go to Halmstads BK.
2003 he was chosen as Halmstads BK's team captain, he succeeded Petter Hansson, prior to the 2010 season he was replaced as teamcaptain by Johnny Lundberg.

On 2 July 2008 against Hammarby IF, 1-1, he played his 400th match for Halmstads BK, of which 245 matches were played in Allsvenskan and 155 were played in Svenska Cupen. At the end of the 2010 season Tommy Jönsson announced that he retired from football after 12 years in Halmstads BK and chose to pursue a career outside football as a financial adviser instead. He retired with less than 2 matches away from holding the record as most matches played for the club. The current holder is Torbjörn Arvidsson

International career
Jönsson represented Sweden three times in 2003. He was part of the starting line-up against both Qatar, victory 3-2, and  Thailand, victory 4-1, and then coming on as a substitute against Croatia, defeat 1-2.

Honours

Halmstads BK:
 Allsvenskan: 2000
Sweden

 King's Cup: 2003

References

External links
 HBK Profile 
 Swedish FA Profile 

1976 births
Living people
Swedish footballers
Sweden international footballers
Sweden under-21 international footballers
Sweden youth international footballers
Association football defenders
Allsvenskan players
Malmö FF players
Halmstads BK players